Goliath Artists is an American management company and record label founded by Shady Records president and co-founder Paul Rosenberg, based in New York City, New York and Detroit, Michigan.

Management

Current artists

Former artists
Action Bronson
The Alchemist
Blink-182
Cypress Hill
D12
DJ AM
DJ Muggs
The Knux
Spark Master Tape
TRV$DJAM
Xzibit

Goliath Records

History
On February 21, 2020 it was reported that Paul Rosenberg was stepping down from Def Jam Recordings as Chairman and CEO to focus his time operating Shady Records, Goliath Artists, and his new venture Goliath Records. The following year, he announced his first signee on the Goliath Records roster, Indiana rapper Vince Ash and released his deluxe version of VITO through Interscope.

Current artists

Discography

References

American record labels
Eminem
Companies based in New York City
Hip hop record labels
Labels distributed by Universal Music Group
Music production companies
Record labels established in 2020
Talent and literary agencies
Vanity record labels
Interscope Records